Navoi Square (Uzbek: Navoiy maydoni) is an area in the city center of Andijan, Uzbekistan. It was originally named Bobur Square, after Babur, the founder of the Mughal dynasty. On 13 May 2005, it was the site of the Andijan Massacre.

References

Andijan
Squares in Uzbekistan